The forfeda (sing. forfid) are the "additional" letters of the Ogham alphabet, beyond the basic inventory of twenty signs. Their name derives from fid ("wood", a term also used for Ogham letters) and the prefix for- ("additional"). The most important of these are five forfeda which were arranged in their own aicme or class, and were invented in the Old Irish period, several centuries after the peak of Ogham usage. They appear to have represented sounds felt to be missing from the original alphabet, maybe  é(o), ó(i), ú(i), p and ch.

The aicme forfeda
The five aicme forfeda are glossed in the manuscripts Auraicept na n-Éces ('The Scholars' Primer),  De dúilib feda ('Elements of the Letters') and In Lebor Ogaim ('The Book of Ogam'), by several Bríatharogaim ("word oghams" ), or two word kennings, which explain the meanings of the names of the letters of the Ogham alphabet. Three variant lists of bríatharogaim or 'word-oghams' have been preserved, dating to the Old Irish period. They are as follows:

Bríatharogam Morainn mac Moín
Bríatharogam Maic ind Óc
Bríatharogam Con Culainn

Later Medieval scholars believed that all of the letter names of the ogham alphabet were those of trees, and attempted to explain the bríatharogaim in that light. However, modern scholarship has shown that only eight at most of the original twenty letter names are those of trees, and that the word-oghams or kennings themselves support this. Of the forfeda letter names, only one may be that of a tree or shrub (pín) and their kennings as edited (in normalized Old Irish) and translated by McManus (1988) are as follows:

The kennings for Ébhadh point to the sound éo or é, which is also the word for "salmon". The name appears modelled after Eadhadh and Iodhadh. The kennings for Ór point to the word ór "gold" (cognate to Latin aurum).  The kenning of Uilleann, "great elbow", refers to the letter name. Since the Ogham alphabet dates to the Primitive Irish period, it had no sign for [p] in its original form and the letter Pín was added as a letter to express it. McManus states that the name Pín was probably influenced by Latin pinus ('pine'), but a more likely explanation is that it derives from Latin spina ('thorn'), as the kennings indicate a tree or shrub with sweet tasting fruit (therefore not a pine). According to Kelly (1976) the name spín ( deriving from the Latin ) appears in the Old Irish tree lists as meaning either gooseberry or thorn, so the medieval glosses may be correct on this occasion. The name Eamhancholl means "twinned coll", referring to the shape of the letter (ᚙ resembling two ᚉ), and also perhaps referring to its sound being similar to that of coll ( being a fricative variant of ). The Bríatharogam kenning "groan of a sick person" refers to a value ch [x], predating the decision that all five forfeda represent vowels.

Apart from the first letter, the forfeda were little used in inscriptions, and this led later oghamists to rearrange them as a series of vowel diphthongs, necessitating a complete change to the sounds of Pín and Eamhancholl (the name Pín also had to be changed to Iphín). This arrangement is how they appear in most manuscripts:
ᚕ (U+1695) Éabhadh: ea, éo  ea;
ᚖ (U+1696) Ór: oi  óe, oi;
ᚗ (U+1697) Uilleann: ui, úa, ui;
ᚘ (U+1698) Ifín: io  ía, ia;
ᚙ (U+1699) Eamhancholl: ae.

This arrangement meant that once again the ogham alphabet was without a letter for the [p] sound, making necessary the creation of Peith (see below).

Inscriptions
Apart from the first letter Eabhadh, the forfeda do not appear often in orthodox ogham inscriptions. Eabhadh was in fact frequently used as part of the formula word KOI ᚕᚑᚔ, but with the value /k/ or /x/. KOI means something like 'here' and is the ogham equivalent of the Latin hic iacet (McManus §5.3, 1991); it is etymologically linked with the Latin cis ("on this side"). It also appears with its vocalic value in later orthodox inscriptions however. Of the other forfeda the next three appear only a few times, and the last letter Eamhancholl does not appear at all. So rare are the other forfeda in inscriptions that it is worthwhile detailing the individual examples (numbering as given by Macalister):

 Óir. This appears twice, once in an inscription in Killogrone in Co. Kerry (235), which reads ANM MÓLEGÓMRID MACI VECUMEN ᚛ᚐᚅᚋ ᚋᚖᚂᚓᚌᚖᚋᚏᚔᚇ ᚋᚐᚉᚔ ᚍᚓᚉᚒᚋᚓᚅ᚜; and once in a late inscription on a cross slab at Formaston in Aberdeenshire, which reads MAQQÓ TALLUORRH NÉHHTV ROBBAC CÉNNEFF ᚛ᚋᚐᚊᚊᚖ ᚈᚐᚂᚂᚒᚑᚏᚏᚆ ᚅᚓᚆᚆᚈᚍ ᚏᚑᚁᚁᚐᚉ ᚉᚓᚅᚅᚓᚃᚃ᚜.
Uilleann. This appears only once, in an inscription in Teeromoyle, again in Co. Kerry (240). The inscription reads MOCURRETI MAQI VLISACESUICMIR ᚛ᚋᚑᚉᚒᚏᚏᚓᚈᚔ ᚋᚐᚊᚔ ᚍᚂᚔᚄᚐᚉᚓᚄᚗᚉᚋᚔᚏ᚜.
Pín. This appears in two, or possibly three, inscriptions. The first is in Cool East on Valencia Island in Co. Kerry (231), and reads LOGITTI MAQI ERPENN ᚛ᚂᚑᚌᚔᚈᚈᚔ ᚋᚐᚊᚔ ᚓᚏᚘᚓᚅ᚜. The letter [p] appears as an X shape instead of the 'double X' shape of the letter, presumably because the correct letter shape is quite hard to carve. The second inscription is in Crickowel in Breconshire in Wales (327) and reads TURPILI MOSAC TRALLONI ᚛ᚈᚒᚏᚘᚔᚂᚔ ᚋᚑᚄᚐᚉ ᚈᚏᚐᚂᚂᚑᚅᚔ᚜. Again an X shape is used. The third and final inscription is in Margam in Glamorganshire in Wales (409) and reads PAMPES ᚛ᚘᚐᚋᚘᚓᚄ᚜. However, much of the inscription is broken off and what remains looks like a squat arrowhead. It almost certainly stands for [p] however, as the ogham inscription is accompanied by one in Latin which confirms the sound.

Other forfeda
Beyond the five Forfeda discussed above, which doubtlessly date to Old Irish times, there is a large number of letter variants and symbols, partly found in manuscripts, and partly in "scholastic" (post 6th century) inscriptions collectively termed "Forfeda". They may date to Old Irish, Middle Irish or even early modern times.

Peith
Due to the "schematicism of later Ogamists" (McManus 1988:167), who insisted on treating the five primary forfeda as vowels, [p] had again to be expressed as a modification of [b], called , after beithe, also called beithe bog "soft beithe" or, tautologically, peithbog (ᚚ Peith, Unicode allocation U+169A).

Manuscript tradition

The 7th-12th century Auraicept na n-Éces among the 92 "variants" of the Ogham script gives more letters identified as forfeda (variant nrs. 79, 80 and 81).

Inscriptions
The Bressay stone in Shetland (CISP BREAY/1) contains five forfeda, three of them paralleled on other Scottish monuments and also in Irish manuscripts, and two  unique to Bressay. One of the latter is possibly a correction of an error in carving and not intended as a forfid. One is "rabbit-eared", interpreted as some kind of modified D, presumably the voiced spirant. Another is an "angled vowel", presumably a modified A. One unique character consists of  five undulating strokes sloping backwards across the stem, possibly a modified I. The fourth is a four-stroke cross-hatching, also appearing in the late eighth or ninth-century Bern ogham alphabet and syllabary under a label which has previously been read as RR, but another suggestions is SS. It appears in the Book of Ballymote, scale no. 64.CISP - BREAY/1

References

Kelly, Fergus 'The Old Irish Tree-list' Celtica 11 (1976) pp122–3
Macalister, Robert A.S. Corpus inscriptionum insularum celticarum. First edition. Dublin: Stationery Office, 1945–1949. OCLC 71392234
McManus, Damian.  Ogam: Archaizing, Orthography and the Authenticity of the Manuscript Key to the Alphabet, Ériu 37, 1988, 1-31. Dublin: Royal Irish Academy. OCLC 56088345
McManus, Damian Irish letter-names and their kennings, Ériu 39 (1988), 127–168.
McManus, Damian. A Guide to Ogam, Maynooth 1991.   OCLC 24181838
Sims-Williams, P The additional letters of the Ogam Alphabet, Cambridge Medieval Celtic Studies, 23: 29-75 (1992).

External links
The Ogam Scales from the Book of Ballymote by B. Fell

Ogham letters